Maria Mercè Marçal i Serra (13 November 1952 – 5 July 1998) was a Catalan poet, professor, writer and translator from Spain.

Biography 
Marçal was born in Barcelona but spent her childhood in Ivars d'Urgell (Pla d'Urgell), which she considered her home. Her mother was Maria Serra, a woman who loved theater and songs, and her father was Antoni Marçal, who had to leave college for family reasons. She had a sister Magda.

She went to high-school in Lleida, at the Institut de Lleida, after receiving a scholarship. She then studied literature at the University of Barcelona, earning a degree in Classical Philology there. She went on to become a Professor of Catalan Language and Literature.

In 1972, Marçal married the poet Ramon Pinyol Balasch. They separated some time afterward.

In 1973, she was co-founder of the publishing house Llibres del Mall with her husband and another young Catalan poet, Xavier Bru de Sala.

In 1980, her daughter Heura was born, an experience that she transformed into tender poetry.

In 1992 she proposed the creation of Catalan Women Writers as part of the Catalan Centre for PEN.

She translated into Catalan works by both French and Russian writers: Colette, Marguerite Yourcenar, Anna Akhmatova, Marina Tsvetaeva, Baudelaire and Leonor Fini.

Marçal died in Barcelona in 1998 of cancer, aged 45.

Legacy

Marina Rossell, Teresa Rebull, Ramon Muntaner, Txiqui Berraondo, Maria del Mar Bonet, Celdoni Fonoll and Gisela Bellsolà have sung Marçal's poems.

Works

In 1976, Marçal's first book of poems Cau de llunes (winning the Carles Riba Prize), introduced by a splendid poetic sestina penned by Joan Brossa, includes the poem "Divisa," which is like a manifesto summarizing what guided her activism:To fate I am grateful for three gifts: having been born a woman,

of low class and oppressed nation.

And the turbid azure of being three times a rebel.

Selected Publications 

Cau de llunes. Barcelona: Proa, 1977. 
Bruixa de dol (1977–1979). Sant Boi de Llobregat: Llibres del Mall, 1979. 
Terra de mai. Valencia: El cingle, 1982. 
Sal oberta. Sant Boi de Llobregat: Llibres del Mall, 1982. 
La germana, l'estrangera (1981–1984). Sant Boi de Llobregat: Llibres del Mall, 1985. 
Contraclaror: antologia poètica, de Clementina Arderiu. Barcelona: La Sal, edicions de les dones, 1985. 
Desglaç (1984–1988). Barcelona: Edicions 62 - Empúries, 1988.
Llengua abolida (1973–1988). Valencia: Climent, 1989. 
La passió segons Renée Vivien. Barcelona: Proa, 1994. 
Paisatge emergent: trenta poetes catalanes del S.XX. Barcelona: La Magrana, 1999. 
Raó del cos. Barcelona: Edicions 62 - Empúries, 2000. 
Contraban de llum: antologia poètica. Barcelona: Proa, 2001. 
El meu amor sense casa (CD). Barcelona: Proa, 2003.

References

External links
 
 Maria-Mercè Marçal - Escriptors
 Fundació Maria-Mercè Marçal, in Catalan.

Poems: http://www.barcelonareview.com/46/c_mmm.htm

Spanish translators
Catalan-language writers
Translators to Catalan
1952 births
1998 deaths
Translators from Catalonia
Deaths from cancer in Spain
University of Barcelona alumni
20th-century translators
Spanish women poets
Women writers from Catalonia
20th-century Spanish poets
20th-century Spanish women writers
Spanish lesbian writers
Lesbian poets